Higher Bal is a hamlet in the parish of St Agnes, Cornwall, England.

References

Hamlets in Cornwall